Cascades Park can refer to:

 Cascades Park (Tallahassee) - a park in Tallahassee, Florida
 Cascades Park (Michigan) - a park in southern Michigan

See also
Cascade Park (disambiguation)
 North Cascades National Park